Jack Frost (born 25 February 1992) is a former professional Australian rules footballer who played for the Collingwood Football Club and Brisbane Lions in the Australian Football League (AFL).

AFL career

Collingwood
He was recruited by Collingwood with forty-first selection in the 2013 rookie draft after playing 10 games with Williamstown in 2011 & 2012, including the 2011 VFL grand final which the VFL Seagulls lost to Port Melbourne. Frost was awarded the best in finals player trophy for Williamstown in 2012. He made his AFL debut in round 1, 2013, against North Melbourne at Etihad Stadium.

Frost played 54 games for Collingwood, but only 10 in the 2016 season as he wasn't a consistent starter.

Brisbane Lions
After being out of contract with Collingwood at the conclusion of the 2016 season, he nominated the Brisbane Lions as his preferred new club. He was officially traded to Brisbane in October.

Frost played two games for Brisbane before suffering concussion. The persistence of ongoing symptoms over the past two years were a concern to  Frost, his family and the Club. At the end of the 2018 season, concussion symptoms forced him to retire. Frost suffered 14 concussions in his six-year AFL career at Brisbane and Collingwood.

Post AFL
Frost is currently coach of Hawthorn's AFL Wheelchair and AFL Blind teams.

Family 

Statistics
 Statistics are correct to the end of the 2018 season

|- style="background-color: #eaeaea"
! scope="row" style="text-align:center" | 2013
|  || 45 || 2 || 0 || 0 || 10 || 6 || 16 || 3 || 9 || 0.0 || 0.0 || 5.0 || 3.0 || 8.0 || 1.5 || 4.5
|- 
! scope="row" style="text-align:center" | 2014
|  || 45 || 22 || 0 || 0 || 109 || 78 || 187 || 69 || 61 || 0.0 || 0.0 || 5.0 || 3.5 || 8.5 || 3.1 || 2.8
|- style="background-color: #eaeaea"
! scope="row" style="text-align:center" | 2015
|  || 45 || 20 || 0 || 0 || 72 || 78 || 150 || 46 || 41 || 0.0 || 0.0 || 3.6 || 3.9 || 7.5 || 2.3 || 2.1
|- 
! scope="row" style="text-align:center" | 2016
|  || 45 || 10 || 0 || 0 || 48 || 48 || 96 || 32 || 31 || 0.0 || 0.0 || 4.8 || 4.8 || 9.6 || 3.2 || 3.1
|-
! scope="row" style="text-align:center" | 2017
|  || 45 || 2 || 0 || 0 || 2 || 8 || 10 || 1 || 2 || 0.0 || 0.0 || 1.0 || 4.0 || 5.0 || 0.5 || 1.0
|- 
! scope="row" style="text-align:center" | 2018
|  || 45 || - || - || - || - || - || - || - || - || - || - || - || - || - || - || 
|- class="sortbottom"
! colspan=3| Career
! 56
! 0
! 0
! 241
! 218
! 459
! 151
! 144
! 0.0
! 0.0
! 4.3
! 3.9
! 8.2
! 2.7
! 2.6
|}

References

External links

 

1992 births
Living people
Collingwood Football Club players
Australian rules footballers from Victoria (Australia)
Williamstown Football Club players
Sandringham Dragons players
Brisbane Lions players